Hildaehirschmannia is a genus of tortoise mites in the family Uropodidae.

References

Uropodidae
Articles created by Qbugbot